Abeynaike is a Sinhalese surname.

Notable people
 Cyril Abeynaike (1911–1991), Anglican Bishop of Colombo
 Ranil Abeynaike (1955–2012), Sri Lankan cricketer

See also
 

Sinhalese surnames